Maharajganj Lok Sabha constituency is one of the 40 Lok Sabha (parliamentary) constituencies in Bihar state in eastern India. There is a constituency by the same name in Uttar Pradesh as well.

Assembly segments
Presently, Maharajganj Lok Sabha constituency comprises the following six Vidhan Sabha (legislative assembly) segments.

Members of Parliament

^ by poll

Elections results

17th Lok Sabha: 2019 General Elections

General Election 2014

By Election 2013

See also
 Saran district
 List of Constituencies of the Lok Sabha

References

External links
Maharajganj lok sabha  constituency election 2019 result details

Lok Sabha constituencies in Bihar
Politics of Siwan district
Politics of Saran district